The Rigwe language, Nkarigwe, is a Plateau language of Nigeria spoken by the Irigwe people mainly found in Bassa Local Government Area of Plateau State.

Rigwe has highly complex phonology. The presence of the lateral fricative /ɫ/ in Rigwe, unusual among Plateau languages, suggests that there used to be West Chadic languages in the area with this phoneme.

Phonology 
Rigwe phonology:

References

External links
Roger Blench: Rigwe page

Central Plateau languages
Languages of Nigeria